Heterodera rosii is a plant pathogenic nematode that attacks chickpea.

References

External links 
 Nemaplex, University of California - Heterodera rosii

rosii
Plant pathogenic nematodes
Pulse crop diseases